Pick and place is the act of picking things up from one location and placing them in another. Specific cases include:

 picking and placing is one of the major uses of industrial robots
 in the context of electronics, SMT placement equipment
 in the context of logistics, an automated storage and retrieval system